Goran Antelj (Serbian Cyrillic: Горан Aнтeљ ; born April 6, 1988 in Belgrade) is a Serbian footballer currently playing in Serbian First League club Bežanija. In 2016, he was diagnosed with cancer.

References

External sources
 Profile at Srbijafudbal.
 

Living people
1988 births
Footballers from Belgrade
Serbian footballers
OFK Beograd players
FK Dinamo Pančevo players
FK BSK Borča players
FK Mladi Radnik players
FK Teleoptik players
FK Bežanija players
FK Metalac Gornji Milanovac players
Serbian SuperLiga players
Warta Poznań players
Expatriate footballers in Poland
Association football forwards
Serbian expatriate sportspeople in Poland